Sumita Prabhakar is an Indian gynecologist, obstetrics and social medico activist. After graduating from Banaras Hindu University, Varanasi, India, she went on to practice at Queen Elizabeth Hospital Malaysia from 1999 to 2001. She returned to India and started practicing at Sitaram Bhartia Institute of Science and Research, Delhi as consultant gynecologist from 2001 to 2002. She serves as the Head of Gynecology at CMI Hospital, Dehradun. She has been organizing free screening and awareness camps for Breast and Cervical cancer since 2014. She served as a president of Federation of Obstetric and Gynaecological Societies of India member body of Dehradun. She has received numerous awards, including the IMA Doctor Achievement Award, Uma Shakti Samman, PNB Hindi Gaurav Samman, Dainik Jagran Medical Excellence Award, Divine Shakti Leadership Award, Youth Icon Award and Medico-Social Activist Award.

Education and career
In 1994 she completed her MBBS from Banaras Hindu University in Varanasi. In 1996 she completed MD (Obs & Gynae), in 1998 she earned her MRCOG (London) from Royal College of Obstetricians and Gynaecologists.

Sumita Prabhakar is the founder, executive director of IVF India CARE, which she started in Dehradun in 2004. She is the Founder of Colposcopy center for cervical cancer screening - It is the only center recognized for training of Doctors for colposcopy by FOGSI in Uttarakhand established in 2002. Sumita has been founder president of Can Protect Foundation, an NGO working towards women's health, breast and cervical prevention and awareness.

As president of Can Protect Foundation, Sumita is highly active in organizing a free screening, educational and training camps for the prevention and awareness of breast and cervical cancer in Uttarakhand and nearby states. She is the founder of Asha ki Kiran campaign, which aims to provide free training and sensitization of Asha and Anganwadi workers for the prevention of breast and cervical cancer.

Biography
Her mother was a teacher and father was an administrative officer in IDPL, Her schooling was done from Kendriya Vidhyala IDPL. She has one son. Her husband Gurdeep Singh, is an orthopedic surgeon.

Honors
IMA Doctor Achievement Award by Indian Medical Association in recognition of distinguished service in the field of Medicine in 2008 
Uma Shakti Samman by Governor of Uttarakhand in recognition of distinguished service in the field of Women's health in 2013
Global Business and Excellence Award by Amar Singh in recognition of distinguished service in the field of infertility treatment
Youth Icon Award in recognition of distinguished service in spreading awareness about menstrual hygiene and breast cancer in 2014
Amar Ujala Samarpan aur Samman by Amar Ujala Publications in recognition of distinguished social service in the field of women's healthcare in 2014.
Health Icon Award by Times of India in recognition of distinguished service of women's healthcare in hilly areas of Uttarakhand
Divine Shakti Leadership Award by Swami Chidananda of Parmarth Ashram in recognition of distinguished work for breast and cervical cancer prevention in remote areas of Uttarakhand.
Dainik Jagran featured her in Uttarakhand's Medical Pillars in 2018.
Medico-Social Activist Award by Indian Medical Association Uttaracon 2018  in recognition for her exemplary contribution, commitments, and dedicated service to the medical profession and society.

References

External links
Sumita Prabhakar on Doordarshan
Launch Meri Maa Swasth Maa Campaign
Can Protect Foundation

Indian gynaecologists
Indian women gynaecologists
Indian obstetricians
Fellows of the Royal College of Obstetricians and Gynaecologists
20th-century Indian medical doctors
20th-century women physicians
Social workers
Social workers from Uttarakhand
Living people
1970 births
20th-century Indian women